Getting Into Knives is the nineteenth studio album by indie folk band the Mountain Goats, released on October 23, 2020, through Merge Records. The album was recorded in March 2020 over six days at Sam Philips Recording in Memphis, in the same room where psychobilly band the Cramps tracked their 1980 debut album Songs the Lord Taught Us. Getting Into Knives was produced, engineered, and mixed by Matt Ross-Spang, who previously engineered In League with Dragons (2019). In addition to being available on streaming and download services, the album also saw physical release on CD, vinyl, and cassette.

The lead single, "As Many Candles as Possible", was released on August 11, 2020, along with a lyric video directed by Lalitree Darnielle. The song features organist Charles Hodges. "Get Famous" was released on September 14, 2020 and the music video, featuring the band as bobbleheads, was released on October 1, 2020. The final single "Picture of My Dress" was released on October 12, 2020.

Track listing
Album and track metadata and details adapted from Bandcamp.

Personnel
The Mountain Goats
 John Darnielle – vocals, guitars, piano
 Peter Hughes – electric bass, upright bass
 Matt Douglas – keyboards, woodwinds, guitars, accordion, backing vocals
 Jon Wurster – drums, percussion 

Additional personnel
 Bram Gielen – piano, guitars, keyboards
 Chris Boerner – guitars
 Charles Hodges – Hammond B-3 
 Sam Shoup – Mellotron
 Tom Clary – horns
 Reba Russell – backing vocals
 Susan Marshall – backing vocals

Production
 Matt Ross-Spang – production, engineering, mixing
 Brent Lambert – mastering (The Kitchen Mastering, Carrboro, North Carolina)
 Daniel Murphy – design
 Wesley Graham – assistant
 Matt Denham – studio attaché
 Ryan Matteson – assistant

Charts

References

External links

2020 albums
Merge Records albums
The Mountain Goats albums
Albums produced by Matt Ross-Spang